Middlesex Fells may refer to:

 Middlesex Fells Reservation, in Middlesex County, Massachusetts, United States
 Middlesex Fells Zoo, former name of the Stone Zoo in Stoneham, Massachusetts